Sepolia is a neighborhood north of the center of Athens, Greece. The Sepolia metro station is situated in the neighborhood. Sepolia owes to its name in the Greek phrase esopolis (έσω πόλις), which means "inside the city". Sepolia was a remote settlement until the latter part of the 19th century, a few kilometers away from Athens. The Greek Census of that period didn't include Sepolia as part of Athens. The Census of 1879, for example, refers to a population of 278 inhabitants. During the following years, Sepolia joined Athens as a result of a population explosion.

Notable people

Giannis Antetokounmpo (1994–) professional basketball player, 2018–19, 2019–20 NBA's Regular Season MVP and 2021 NBA Champion and NBA Finals Most Valuable Player
Kostas Antetokounmpo (1997–) professional NBA basketball player and 2020 NBA Champion
Thanasis Antetokounmpo (1992–) professional NBA basketball player and 2021 NBA Champion
Aggelos Mendrinos, sports writer
Argyris Chionis (1943-2011) poet

Transport
In the past, it was also served by the Thymarakia suburban station and by tram 8 in Agios Meletis.

References

Neighbourhoods in Athens